The Canadian Modern Language Review is a quarterly peer-reviewed academic journal focusing on second language learning and teaching. CMLR publishes articles in English and French and is published by the University of Toronto Press.

Abstracting and indexing
The journal is abstracted and indexed in:
 Academic Search Alumni Edition
 Academic Search Complete
 Academic Search Elite
 Academic Search Premier
 Book Review Digest Plus
 Canadian Almanac & Directory
 CBCA Education
 Canadian Periodical Index
 Canadian Reference Centre
 China Education Publications Import & Export Corporation (CEPIEC)
 Communication & Mass Media Complete
 Communication & Mass Media Index
 Communication Source
 CrossRef
 CSA Sociological Abstracts
 Cultures, Langues, Textes: La revue de sommaires
 Education Abstracts
 Education Full Text
 Education Research Complete
 Education Source
 EJS EBSCO Electronic Journals Service
 Google Scholar
 International Bibliography of the Social Sciences (IBSS)
 Language Teaching
 Microsoft Academic Search
 MLA International Bibliography
 OmniFile Full Text Mega
 Project MUSE
 ScienceDirect Navigator
 Scopus
 Social Sciences Citation Index
 Ulrich's Periodicals Directory

References

External links

University of Toronto Press academic journals
Quarterly journals
Publications established in 1967
English-language journals